The 1999 European Individual Speedway Junior Championship was the second edition of the Championship.

Qualification
 	Qualifying round:
June 6, 1999
 Pori
Semi-Final A:
June 20, 1999
 Rivne
Semi-Final B:
July 25, 1999
 Ljubljana

Final
August 1, 1999
 Gniezno

References

1999
Euro I J